Karin Van de Graaf ( is an Australian swimmer. She competed in five events at the 1980 Summer Olympics.

References

External links
 

1962 births
Living people
Australian female swimmers
Olympic swimmers of Australia
Swimmers at the 1980 Summer Olympics
Place of birth missing (living people)